At least two ships of the French Navy have been named Sénégalais:

 , an  launched in 1917 and struck in 1936.
 , a  launched in 1943 as USS Corbesier and transferred to France in 1944. She was renamed Yser in 1952 and scrapped in 1965.

French Navy ship names